Alexis Crimes (born June 12, 1986) is an American female volleyball player. She was part of the United States women's national volleyball team.

She participated in the 2009 FIVB Volleyball World Grand Prix.
On the club level she played for BKS Stal Bielsko-Biala in 2009.

Clubs
 Sarıyer Bld. (2016-)

References

External links

1986 births
Living people
American women's volleyball players
Place of birth missing (living people)
Middle blockers
Expatriate volleyball players in Turkey
American expatriate sportspeople in Turkey
African-American volleyball players
21st-century African-American sportspeople
21st-century African-American women
20th-century African-American people
Long Beach State Beach women's volleyball players
20th-century African-American women
American volleyball coaches